Ripped 'n' Torn is the eighth studio album by punk rock band The Lurkers.

Track listing 

"One Day" - 2:30
"Nothing There For Me" - 1:57
"Ripped 'N' Torn" - 2:54
"Extreme Heat Burning" - 1:45
"Red Light Girl" - 3:33
"Too Lazy To Bleed" - 2:01
"Don't Seem Right To Me" - 2:22
"Furry Face" - 2:24
"Don't Pick It Up" - 1:22
"Gotta Go" - 2:12
"False Fun" - 3:39
"Special Friend" - 2:00
"Scream And Shout" 2:20
"Shouldn't Do It" - 2:01
"Slabs Of Gray" - 3:31
"Who Wears The Crown" - 2:32
"Start All Over (Do It Again)" - 2:29

Personnel

Arturo Bassick - Bass, Vocals
Dan Tozer - Drums, Backing vocals
Tom Spencer - Guitar

References

1995 albums
The Lurkers albums